Quernmore is a civil parish in Lancaster, Lancashire, England.  It contains 28 listed buildings that are recorded in the National Heritage List for England.  Of these, one is listed at Grade I, the highest of the three grades, one is at Grade II*, the middle grade, and the others are at Grade II, the lowest grade.  Apart from the small village of Quernmore, the parish is rural.  Most of the listed buildings are houses, farmhouses, and associated structures.  The most important house in the parish is Quernmore Park; this and associated buildings are listed.  The other listed buildings include a church, a former school, an aqueduct, a former corn mill, and a former railway bridge.

Key

Buildings

References

Citations

Sources

Lists of listed buildings in Lancashire
Buildings and structures in the City of Lancaster